Manny Motajo (born February 13, 1970) is a retired Nigerian soccer defender who played professionally in the USISL, Continental Indoor Soccer League and Major League Soccer.

In 1987, Motajo began his career with First Bank F.C. in the Nigeria National League.  In 1989, he entered Howard University in the  United States.  He played soccer at Howard from 1989 to 1992.  In 1994, he played for the Washington Mustangs in the USISL.  He then moved to the Washington Warthogs in the Continental Indoor Soccer League for the 1994 and 1995 indoor seasons.  Motajo caught the eye of scouts from Major League Soccer during the league’s initial open tryouts.  This led to his selection in February 1996, by the Los Angeles Galaxy in the 9th round (84th overall) in the 1996 MLS Inaugural Player Draft.  He played twenty games for the Galaxy in 1996, but was waived on November 8.  In 1997, he played for the Jacksonville Cyclones of the USISL A-League.  The New England Revolution signed Motajo on May 22, 1998. He played seventeen games for the Revolution over two seasons before being waived on June 15, 1999 to clear a roster spot for the recently signed Chaka Daley. He also played for the Nigerian national under-21 team between 1988 and 1989.

References

1970 births
Living people
People from Greenbelt, Maryland
Sportspeople from the Washington metropolitan area
Soccer players from Maryland
Nigerian footballers
Association football defenders
First Bank F.C. players
Continental Indoor Soccer League players
Howard Bison men's soccer players
Jacksonville Cyclones players
LA Galaxy players
Major League Soccer players
New England Revolution players
USISL players
Washington Mustangs players
Washington Warthogs players